The 2014–15 A.C. ChievoVerona season was the club's eighth consecutive season in Serie A. The team competed in Serie A, finishing 14th, and in the Coppa Italia, where Chievo was eliminated in the third round by Pescara.

Players

Squad information
In italics players who left the club during the season.

Transfers

In

Out

Pre-season and friendlies

Competitions

Serie A

League table

Results summary

Results by round

Matches

Coppa Italia

Statistics

Appearances and goals

|-
! colspan="10" style="background:#FFFF00; color:blue; border:2px solid blue; text-align:center"| Goalkeepers

|-
! colspan="10" style="background:#FFFF00; color:blue; border:2px solid blue; text-align:center"| Defenders

|-
! colspan="10" style="background:#FFFF00; color:blue; border:2px solid blue; text-align:center"| Midfielders

|-
! colspan="10" style="background:#FFFF00; color:blue; border:2px solid blue; text-align:center"| Forwards

|-
! colspan="10" style="background:#FFFF00; color:blue; border:2px solid blue; text-align:center"| Players transferred out during the season

Goalscorers

Last updated: 24 May 2015

References

A.C. ChievoVerona seasons
Chievo